Hugh Niblock (September 1949 – 18 February 2022) was a Gaelic footballer who played for the Magherafelt and St Gall's clubs and at senior level for the Derry county team. He usually lined out as a forward.

Career
Niblock first played Gaelic football at juvenile and underage levels with the Magherafelt club. He progressed onto the club's senior team and won a Derry SFC title in 1975, in what was the club's first ever championship success at inter-county level. Niblock first appeared for the Derry minor football team in 1967 before later joining the under-21 side. As a member of the Derry senior football team, he won Ulster Championship titles in 1970 and 1975. Niblock subsequently became involved with the St. Gall's club in Belfast.

Personal life and death
Niblock was born in Magherafelt in September 1949. His family had a strong association with sport, with his uncle, Frank Niblock, lining out for Derry when they won the National League in 1947. Niblock's brother, Mickey, was a contemporary on the Derry team, while his nephew, David Niblock, won a Munster Championship title with Cork. Niblock qualified as a teacher and spent the majority of his working life in St Patrick's College in Belfast.

Niblock died on 18 February 2022, at the age of 72.

Honours
Magherafelt
Derry Senior Football Championship: 1978

Derry
Ulster Senior Football Championship: 1970, 1975

References

1949 births
2022 deaths
Derry inter-county Gaelic footballers
Gaelic football forwards
Magherafelt Gaelic footballers
Hugh
St Gall's Gaelic footballers